Stroock is a surname. Notable people with the surname include:

Daniel W. Stroock (born 1940), American mathematician
Geraldine Stroock (1925–1977), maiden name of Geraldine Brooks, American actress
Gloria Stroock (born 1923), American actress
Moses J. Stroock (1866–1931), American lawyer
Sol M. Stroock (1873–1941), American lawyer
Thomas F. Stroock (1925–2009), American businessman, ambassador, and politician from Wyoming

See also
Stroock & Stroock & Lavan LLP, American law firm based in New York City
Strack
Strick
Struck
Sturrock